Starkiller, born Galen Marek and also known as The Apprentice, is the fictional protagonist of the Star Wars: The Force Unleashed video games and literature, part of the now non-canonical Star Wars Legends expanded universe; however, his first appearance was as a guest character, alongside Darth Vader and Yoda, in the fighting video game Soulcalibur IV. He is voiced by and modeled after actor Sam Witwer, who would go on to voice other characters in Star Wars expanded media, most notably Darth Maul and Emperor Palpatine.

Within the fictional Star Wars universe, Galen Marek was born as the son of a fugitive Jedi during the early reign of the Galactic Empire. When his father is tracked down and killed by Darth Vader as part of the Empire's "Great Jedi Purge", the latter discovers Galen and, recognizing his potential as a powerful Force user, takes him to be raised and trained as his secret apprentice, giving him the codename "Starkiller". Years later, Vader uses Starkiller as his personal assassin, sending him on missions to benefit the Empire, as well as his own plans to overthrow Palpatine. Once Starkiller outlives his usefulness for Vader, he is betrayed and left for dead, prompting him to become a  Jedi and join the recently-formed Rebel Alliance. Although the first The Force Unleashed game ends with Starkiller sacrificing himself for the Rebellion, the sequel reveals that Vader later cloned him in an attempt to create the perfect, obedient apprentice. The Force Unleashed II follows a clone of the original Starkiller who escapes Vader's restraints and goes on to join the Rebellion in the fight against the Empire.

The first game's downloadable content follows a different incarnation of Starkiller, continuing from the events of the game's non-canonical ending. In this alternate timeline, rather than giving his life for the Rebellion, Starkiller murders Vader and is severely injured during a confrontation with Palpatine. The latter saves his life by putting him in a suit similar to Vader's, but only so that he could serve as his new apprentice. Now known as Lord Starkiller, he becomes instrumental in helping the Empire eliminate the Rebellion over the following years, during alternate depictions of the events from the original Star Wars trilogy. Similarly, the second game features an expansion in which an evil Starkiller clone loyal to Vader and dubbed "the Dark Apprentice" hunts down the Rebellion's leaders during an alternate depiction of Return of the Jedi.

Starkiller's character was conceived as a powerful Force user, with abilities that far exceed those seen in the Star Wars films. His annihilative nature has earned him the description of a "Force wrecking ball". The character's name is taken from Luke Skywalker's original name, "Luke Starkiller". Starkiller has had a mostly positive reception from fans and critics.

Concept and creation

George Lucas motivated the team working on Star Wars: The Force Unleashed to make a brand-new character. Before deciding on Starkiller's character, other ideas for the main character included a Han Solo-like smuggler, a superheroic Rebel Wookiee, "the last Skywalker" and a gadget-wielding mercenary. The developers used feedback from focus test respondents and executives at LucasArts in order to make Starkiller. The developers consciously decided not to give him a name in the game, but as the novel's author Sean Williams said he needed a name, "Galen Marek" was given in the novel.

Starkiller was designed as Luke Skywalker's photo-negative, and is named after "Annikin Starkiller" (Luke or Anakin Skywalker's original name in the early Star Wars scripts). The developers tried to avoid making Starkiller too rigidly defined while keeping the character developed. The developers also wanted to avoid making Starkiller seem irredeemably evil, and used elements of his backstory and his relationships with other characters to balance it, while trying not to explain too much of his backstory. In order to avoid the character being over emotional, they tried to let short pieces of dialogue and looks carry scenes so that the player could interpret how Starkiller felt. They attempted to make Starkiller feel like he would belong in the classic Star Wars trilogy by making his actions faster and more intense. During an interview to Haden Blackman by The Guardian, he claimed that most of the testing players wanted the character to be ultimately redeemed by the end of the game.

Starkiller was voiced by and given the likeness of Samuel Witwer. According to Blackman, the staff were very hard on Witwer when casting him, but claimed he was far above the other candidates and that "he was already inhabiting the mind of this character". Starkiller's expressions are based on Witwer's, which Blackman described as "a new approach for LucasArts", noting that it "affected the way we handled casting for The Force Unleashed" and comparing it to how people see Bill Nighy as Davy Jones in the Pirates of the Caribbean movies. Blackman noted that Witwer brought new ideas and a sense of humanity to Starkiller. Sam Witwer has said that Starkiller would be a character he wouldn't mind revisiting.

During the concept stages of Star Wars: The Force Unleashed II, the developers considered replacing the character with either a new Force wielder or a previously named Star Wars character; however, they decided to keep Starkiller as the player character as they were fond of and attached to him. Also, the development team felt that there was more story that he could supply, and that a franchise could be built around him. Blackman commented that after deciding how to have Starkiller return, he felt "it all made sense and fell into place". Developers tried to make The Force Unleashed more personal to Starkiller, with the game focusing on Starkiller's search for the truth of his identity.

Characterization

Witwer compared him as being "two parts Han Solo, one part Darth Maul, one part Indiana Jones [...] and then one essential part Luke Skywalker", noting that in the character's development "behind it all, there had to be this wide-eyed kid who was trying to figure out what the hell to do". According to Witwer, Starkiller's characteristics and personality depended on who he was talking to and what circumstances he is in. Witwer called him "a really interesting guy, speaking of layered characters". Although acting as a villain in the beginning of the first game, Blackman has commented how Starkiller is "really just this damaged kid."

Haden Blackman noted that in the first Starkiller was a hunter, while in the second Starkiller is more a fugitive. Matt Filbrandt, one of the producers of The Force Unleashed II, said that the Starkiller in the second game is trying to find out "who he is" and "what it means to be human".

Fictional history

In the Star Wars series

The Force Unleashed
In the Star Wars: The Force Unleashed video game, Darth Vader dispatches Starkiller to kill a number of Jedi who have survived the Great Jedi Purge. Starkiller is initially kept in secret, but he is discovered by Emperor Palpatine, he is seemingly betrayed and killed by Vader. His master later resurrects him, and assigns him a new mission: to find and unite the Galactic Empire's enemies. Vader later betrays Starkiller a second time and attempts to kill those he united, but Starkiller sacrifices himself for the Rebel Alliance, becoming a martyr to inspire the rebels. During the game, he falls in love with Captain Juno Eclipse, an ex-Imperial Shuttle Pilot and his own ship's pilot. If Starkiller chooses to kill Vader rather than the Emperor at the end of the game, Starkiller becomes a minion of the Emperor and is put into a suit similar to Vader's. Starkiller reappears in this suit in the game's Ultimate Sith Edition, which continues the dark-side path as a "what if" story. However, the light-side ending is the canon ending, and is used in the novel adaption and sequels.

The Force Unleashed II
In the Star Wars: The Force Unleashed II video game and comic, as well as the novel, Starkiller is cloned by Darth Vader. Starkiller's clone is haunted by visions of the original Starkiller's life. After escaping Kamino, Starkiller goes on a quest to find out who he is and to find Juno Eclipse who has been kidnapped by Vader. At the end of the game, if the player chooses the light-side ending, Starkiller spares Vader, capturing him, and rescues Juno. But in the dark side ending, Starkiller is stabbed just before he can kill Vader by the Dark Apprentice (another successful clone) trained by Vader. Starkiller's dark side clone reappeared in downloadable content for the video game, which takes place on Endor, during an alternate depiction of Return of the Jedi. The light side ending is also used in the novel adaptation, though the dark side ending is used as a vision Starkiller sees on Juno's ship, the Salvation.

Attempted canon reintroduction
After the Unleashed franchise was discontinued following Disney's decision to reboot the Star Wars canon in favor of producing a sequel trilogy, Sam Witwer, Marek's voice actor, revealed that Dave Filoni, the creator of the Star Wars Rebels animated series, considered bringing Marek back into the new canon and having him appear in that series as a member of the Sith Inquisitorius, but ultimately decided against it because he could not find a way to do so without compromising either the new canon's quality or the character's unique distinctions.

In novels
Sean Williams' novelization was released in the United States on 19 August 2008. It spent one week as #1 on both Publishers Weeklys and The New York Times hardcover fiction bestsellers lists, slipping to #7 and #9, respectively, the following week. It also reached #15 on USA Todays bestsellers list.

Williams took on the writing project in part because of the "catchy description" of The Force Unleashed being "Episode 3.5" of the Star Wars saga. The novel focuses on the dark side of the Force and its practitioners; Williams found it "interesting" to portray the Jedi as "bad guys." The author most enjoyed developing the character of Juno Eclipse, exploring the "feminine" side of The Force Unleashed in a way the video game does not. Williams also said that while the game allows the player to "do" Starkiller's actions, the novel allows readers to experience Starkiller's thoughts about those actions, adding another dimension to the story.

Dark Horse's The Force Unleashed graphic novel was published 18 August 2008. Newsarama called the graphic novel a "solid story" that matches the video game source material in both structure and plot. IGN gave the graphic novel a score of 6.9/10 (6.4/10 for art, 7.5/10 for the writing), praising the overall story but faulting inconsistency in the art and questioning whether the comic medium was the best way to convey the story.

Other appearances
Outside of Star Wars, Starkiller made his debut as a fighter in Soulcalibur IV, alongside Darth Vader and Yoda. In this game, he is known as "The Apprentice". After Vader sends him to investigate a dimensional rift that seems to be growing, he passes through to the Soulcalibur universe. The Apprentice defeats Algol and returns to Vader without either the Soul Edge or the Soul Calibur, due to perceiving them as worthless. Vader Force Chokes the Apprentice for disobeying him, causing the Apprentice to draw his lightsaber and prepare to fight Vader. Starkiller also appears in Star Wars: Visions of the Blade, an Infinities comic focusing on the Soulcalibur and Star Wars crossover.  Starkiller was also added as a playable character in Electronic Arts' free-to-play mobile turn-based role-playing game Star Wars: Galaxy of Heroes, along with several other memorable characters from the now non-canon Star Wars expanded universe, to celebrate Lucasfilm's 50th anniversary in 2021. He also appears as a secret playable character in Lego Star Wars III: The Clone Wars, and can only be obtained by collecting all ten Minikits in the level “Defenders of Peace”. He is classified as a “Classic” character, despite not originating from the Star Wars films.

Reception

Promotion
Various types of merchandising have been released based on Starkiller. Hasbro has made multiple action figures of Starkiller, along with the rest of the characters in Star Wars: The Force Unleashed. A Lego version of Starkiller was released as one of the three figures in the Rogue Shadow Lego set. At Toy Fair 2007, Hasbro also showed seven figures from their action figure line based on the game. Lego released a model of the main character's ship, the Rogue Shadow.

Critical response
Overall, critics and fans have generally praised the character. GamesRadar staff ranked Starkiller 60th place in a list of the 100 best heroes in video games, published in 2013. UGO Networks chose the character as the 50th top Star Wars Expanded Universe character. IGNs Jesse Schedeen called Starkiller's appearance in Soulcalibur IV the second best bonus character in the series, complementing his inclusion from a story standpoint as "[Soulcalibur IV] is about the dichotomy between good and evil, corruption and redemption, [...] Starkiller is a Dark Jedi who finds himself at a crossroads. He can either follow his master and take control of the galaxy, or break away and seek out his own destiny", with Schedeen later including Starkiller in a list of characters that would make up their idea of the ultimate fighting game. Chris Buffa also put the character as the 24th top gaming hunk, saying that "nothing compares to a bad boy". Jesse Schedeen called Starkiller one of the most promising player characters to be released during fall 2008. After the release of The Force Unleashed, Robert Workman, also from GameDaily, put the character as one of his favorite Star Wars video game characters. Buffa chose Starkiller as one of the top double-crossing characters. Jesse Schedeen of IGN has listed Starkiller as one of the best video game entertainers of 2008, commenting that "Starkiller unleashed the Force in ways the movies never showed us". Some publications and critics have labelled Starkiller as "comically" and "ridiculously" overpowered due to his extraordinary prowess as a Force wielder. TheGamer wrote how the character was able to achieve "crushing AT-STs into balls like tin foil", while Polygon highlighted that he "survives a Vader stab-wound and being hurled into the vacuum of space before pulling a Star Destroyer to the ground with his Force mojo."

UGO Networks listed Sam Witwer's performance as Starkiller as one of their top 11 celebrity voice actors in video games. Chris Buffa put Starkiller as the 19th top anti-hero, commenting that  "the thought of cutting through good guys as a Sith filled us with murderous joy", also praising his eventual turn to good. Jesse Schedeen also thought that it would be best if the character was not revisited in the upcoming live-action TV series after the first The Force Unleashed as "his story arc was nice and complete". Starkiller was voted the top 10th Star Wars character by IGNs readers. IGN later claimed Starkiller as the 34th top Star Wars character. GameSpot listed Starkiller, as "The Apprentice", in a vote for the all-time greatest video game character. Starkiller was eliminated in the first round after being put against Niko Bellic, the main character of Grand Theft Auto IV, with Starkiller garnering 44.9% of the votes. Starkiller was also voted as the 17th top video game character by Game Informer's readers. Game Informer listed him sixth on their list of the "Top 10 Dorks", saying "The words "jedi" and "dork" rarely go together, but Starkiller is the Chosen One to unite them".

References

External links

Fictional assassins in video games
Action-adventure game characters
Clone characters in video games
Fictional space pilots
Fictional characters with electric or magnetic abilities
Fictional revolutionaries
Fictional defectors
Fictional swordfighters in video games
Fictional henchmen in video games
Male characters in video games
Orphan characters in video games
Star Wars characters who are Force-sensitive
Science fiction video game characters
Star Wars Legends characters
Star Wars video game characters
Video game characters introduced in 2008
Video game protagonists
Video game characters who can move at superhuman speeds
Video game characters who have mental powers
Video game characters with electric or magnetic abilities